The Zagato Maserati Mostro is a limited edition car, produced by Zagato and revealed at the 2015 Villa d'Este Concours d'Elegance.

History 
It was created to celebrate the 100-years anniversary of Maserati. It uses the V8 engine and transmission of the Maserati GranTurismo. Only 5 cars were produced by Zagato. The car is a tribute to the Maserati 450S Coupé of 1957 bodied by Zagato. Just as the original Mostro was built for racing and subsequently converted into a road car, so the modern-day Mostro has been created primarily for track use using racing technology, while also being useable on the road. The car presented at the concours did not have a wing but the red car offered in February 2020 at a Bonhams auction in Paris did have one.

Specifications 
The chassis is based on the Gillet Vertigo .5. It is of carbon fibre 'MonoCell' construction, supplemented by a mid-structure of steel tubes forming the cockpit and a sub-frame supporting the fuel tank, exhaust system, rear suspension and gearbox. Made in Italy, the bodywork is entirely carbon fibre.

Set back in the chassis, the 4.2-litre Maserati V8 engine has dry-sump lubrication and is equipped with a programmable engine management system. Power (undisclosed but estimated to be in the region of 460bhp) reaches the ground via a semi-automatic, six-speed rear transaxle, an arrangement that optimises front/rear weight distribution. Suspension is by double wishbones front and rear with pushrod actuation of the springs/dampers. The alloy wheels are 19" in diameter and there are large disc brakes all round.

Gallery

References

Maserati concept vehicles
Cars introduced in 2015